Sara Alice Britcliffe (born 21 February 1995) is a British Conservative Party politician, who has served as the Member of Parliament (MP) for Hyndburn since the general election of 2019. At the age of 24, she was the youngest Conservative MP elected in the election, and the first to represent the constituency since 1992. She was also a councillor on Hyndburn Borough Council between 2018 and 2021. She has been the Vice Chairman of the Conservative Party for Youth since September 2022.

Early life
Britcliffe attended St Christopher's Church of England High School, Accrington. Her father, Peter, is the councillor for the Oswaldtwistle division on Lancashire County Council. She has two older brothers. Her mother, Gabrielle Kroger, died in 2004, when Britcliffe was nine years old. She studied modern languages at the University of Manchester.

Britcliffe served in the ceremonial role of mayoress between 2017 and 2018, alongside her father, who was the mayor on Hyndburn Borough Council. He stood down from the council in 2018. She was elected as a councillor for the ward of St. Andrews (previously represented by her father) at the 2018 Hyndburn Borough Council election. Britcliffe did not stand in the next election in 2021 and her seat was won by her father. Prior to her political career, she managed a sandwich shop in Oswaldtwistle.

Parliamentary career
Britcliffe was selected as the Conservative candidate for the constituency of Hyndburn on 6 November 2019. Her father had previously contested the seat at the general elections of 1997 and 2001. She was elected as MP for the constituency at the general election of 2019, with a majority of 2,951 (7.0%). The seat had been represented by Labour Party MPs since the general election of 1992. Its last Conservative MP was Ken Hargreaves, who had held the seat from 1983 to 1992. At the age of 24, she was the youngest Conservative MP elected in the election.

Her first overseas trip was to Pakistan, as part of an all-party delegation in February 2020. Britcliffe was a member of the Women and Equalities Committee between March 2020 and March 2021. She is a member of the parliamentary council of the centre-right think tank the Northern Policy Foundation, and of the Northern Research Group.

On 28 April 2020, Britcliffe became the first MP to deliver her maiden speech from outside the House of Commons, after parliament adopted a system in which members could contribute to debates virtually during the COVID-19 pandemic. On 29 January 2021, she became a Parliamentary Private Secretary (PPS) in the Department for Education. She resigned as PPS on 6 July 2022, in protest at Prime Minister Boris Johnson's handling of the Chris Pincher scandal. Britcliffe endorsed Nadhim Zahawi in the July 2022 Conservative Party leadership election. After Zahawi was eliminated, she backed Liz Truss. 

On 30 September 2022, Britcliffe became the Conservative Party's Vice-Chairman for Youth. In this role, she has highlighted the importance of the party engaging with issues that affect young people, including housing and childcare, particularly given its poor poll ratings with this group in 2022.

References

External links

Living people
UK MPs 2019–present
Alumni of the University of Manchester
Conservative Party (UK) councillors
Conservative Party (UK) MPs for English constituencies
Councillors in Lancashire
Female members of the Parliament of the United Kingdom for English constituencies
Members of the Parliament of the United Kingdom for constituencies in Lancashire
21st-century British women politicians
1995 births
21st-century English women
21st-century English people
Women councillors in England